Pa is an electric locomotive used by Swedish State Railways for hauling passenger trains on Malmbanan. It was delivered by ASEA in 1914-15 and was in service until the 1950s. Malmbanan was the first electrified railway owned by the state (several private lines was already electrified) in Sweden, and SJ needed a fast locomotive to haul the passenger trains on the line. One of the units is preserved.

External links
 Järnväg.net on Pa 

ASEA locomotives
Pa
15 kV AC locomotives
Standard gauge locomotives of Sweden
Railway locomotives introduced in 1914